Darabad-e Shahzadeh (also Romanized as Darābād-e Shāhzadeh; also known as Darābād-e Emām and Darbābād-e Shāzdeh) is a village in Tabadkan Rural District, in the Central District of Mashhad County, Razavi Khorasan Province, Iran. At the 2006 census, its population was 1,631, in 430 families.

References 

Populated places in Mashhad County